Steven P. Tosches (born c. 1956) is an American former college football coach. He was the head coach at Princeton University from 1987 to 1999. Tosches had previously served as an assistant on the coaching staffs at Princeton, the University of Maine, and the University of Rhode Island. He played college football as a quarterback at Idaho State and Rhode Island.

Early life and college career
Tosches attended Westhill High School in Stamford, Connecticut, and played on the football team as a quarterback. In 1973, the Connecticut Chapter of the National Football Hall of Fame honored Tosches as a scholar-athlete.

Idaho State 
He attended college at Idaho State University, where as a freshman, he played quarterback on the football team in 1974.

Rhode Island 
He transferred to the University of Rhode Island in 1976 to follow his head coach, Bob Griffin. After sitting out one season due to NCAA transfer rules, Tosches played on the football team from 1977 to 1978. In his final season, he earned places on the All-Yankee Conference, All-New England and All-East Division I-AA teams. He compiled 2,693 passing yards at Rhode Island and 4,772 over the course of his career. Tosches graduated from URI in 1979.

Professional career

Hamilton Tiger-Cats 
Tosches spent one season playing professional football for the Hamilton Tiger-Cats of the Canadian Football League (CFL).

Coaching career

Early years 
Tosches began his coaching career as an assistant under his former college coach Bob Griffin at Rhode Island in 1980. He was responsible for the team's offensive backfield. The following year, he took a job on the staff of head coach Ron Rogerson at the University of Maine, where he served as the wide receivers coach. By 1984, Tosches had been promoted to the offensive coordinator position at Maine.

Princeton 
Tosches followed Rogerson to Princeton University as his offensive coordinator. On August 8, 1987, Rogerson died of a heart attack while jogging at the age of 44, and Tosches was promoted as his replacement. He led the Tigers to the Ivy League championship in 1989, 1992, and 1995. After the 1989 season, he was awarded the Scott M. Whitelaw Trophy as the Eastern Division I-AA Coach of the Year. Tosches coached the Ivy League Senior All-Stars in the 1993 Epson Ivy Bowl in Tokyo, Japan. He failed to achieve a winning season from 1996 to 1999, and posted a 17–23 record over that period. Princeton fired Tosches in November 1999 and bought out the remaining time left on his contract.

Head coaching record

Honors 
Tosches was inducted into the University of Rhode Island Athletic Hall of Fame in 1996.

References

1950s births
Living people
American football quarterbacks
Hamilton Tiger-Cats players
Idaho State Bengals football players
Maine Black Bears football coaches
Princeton Tigers football coaches
Rhode Island Rams football coaches
Rhode Island Rams football players
Sportspeople from Stamford, Connecticut
Players of American football from Connecticut